Jarchinio Angelo Roberto Antonia (born 27 December 1990) is a Curaçaoan professional footballer who plays as a winger for Eerste Divisie club NAC Breda and the Curaçao national team.

Club career
Antonia formerly played for ADO Den Haag and moved to Go Ahead Eagles in summer 2011 after spending a half year on loan at Go Ahead from January that year. In summer 2014 he joined FC Groningen for a fee of €200,000.

On 27 July 2017, Cypriot First Division club Omonia Nicosia announced the signing of Antonia. He made his debut on 10 September against Ethnikos Achna on the first matchday of the 2017–18 season. He then moved to AEL Limassol in January 2019.

On 2 September 2019, Antonia signed a two-year contract with Cambuur as a free agent.

On 30 August 2021, he moved to NAC Breda on a two-year contract.

International career
Antonia was born in the Netherlands to parents of Curaçaoan descent. He was called up to the Curaçao national football team in March 2016, and made his debut in a 1–0 loss to Barbados. Het recently scored his first goal during the 2nd match for Curacao vs. Saint Vincent and the Grenadines on 25 March 2021.

Honours

Club
Groningen
KNVB Cup: 2014–15

Cambuur
Eerste Divisie: 2020–21

International
Curaçao
 Caribbean Cup: 2017
 King's Cup: 2019

References

External links

 Voetbal International profile 

1990 births
Living people
Footballers from Amsterdam
Dutch people of Curaçao descent
Association football wingers
Dutch footballers
Curaçao footballers
Curaçao international footballers
Expatriate footballers in Cyprus
ADO Den Haag players
Go Ahead Eagles players
FC Groningen players
AC Omonia players
AEL Limassol players
SC Cambuur players
NAC Breda players
Eredivisie players
Eerste Divisie players
Cypriot First Division players
2017 CONCACAF Gold Cup players
2019 CONCACAF Gold Cup players